Burkholderia glumae is a Gram-negative, soil-borne, betaproteobacterium.

Genome 
Of all bacteria with the necessary sequence data available, B. glumae has the highest number of prophages (bacteriophages integrated into its genome).

References

External links
 Louisiana Agriculture, Summer 2011, Vol. 54, pp. 16/17
 Texas Rice, September 2010, Vol. X, pp. 3/8
 Type strain of Burkholderia glumae at BacDive -  the Bacterial Diversity Metadatabase

Burkholderiaceae
Bacterial plant pathogens and diseases
Rice diseases
Bacteria described in 1994